Alexei Valerievich Devotchenko (14 October 1965 – 5 November 2014) was a Russian actor and activist.

Born in Leningrad, he studied at the school No. 179 of the Kalinin District (1973-1983). Devotchenko got his first acting experience in Theater of Youth Creativity (1978-1983). In 1990 he graduated from the Cherkasov Leningrad State Institute of Theatre, Music and Cinematography, workshop of Arkady Katzman and Lev Dodin. He was a member of the United Civil Front in St. Petersburg, the participant Dissenters. March 10, 2010 signed the appeal of the Russian opposition "Putin must go".

On 18 November 2011, in his Live Journal blog Devotchenko announced that he refused the title Honored Artist of Russia and the two State Prizes of Russia, and called on cultural figures to boycott events that support the Russian government. In March 2014, he signed a letter "We are with you!" opposing the Russian military intervention in Ukraine.

On 5 November 2014, Alexei Devotchenko was found dead in a pool of blood in his apartment in Moscow.

References

External links
 
 Alexei Devotchenko   Online Film Teatr.ru

Male actors from Saint Petersburg
Russian male film actors
Russian male stage actors
Russian male television actors
1965 births
2014 deaths
20th-century Russian male actors
21st-century Russian male actors
Soviet male actors
Honored Artists of the Russian Federation
State Prize of the Russian Federation laureates
Russian State Institute of Performing Arts alumni